Alexander Henry Fenwick Armstrong (born 2 March 1970) is an English actor, comedian, radio personality, television presenter and singer. He is the host of the BBC One game show Pointless, as well as the morning show on Classic FM.

He is one half of the comedy duo Armstrong and Miller. Armstrong's television credits include Armstrong and Miller, Beast, Life Begins, Hunderby and Danger Mouse. He is also known as the voice of Mr Smith, Sarah Jane Smith's alien (Xylok) supercomputer in The Sarah Jane Adventures and the series 4 two-part finale of Doctor Who.

Armstrong is a bass-baritone and has released three studio albums.

Early life
Alexander Henry Fenwick Armstrong was born in Rothbury, Northumberland, on 2 March 1970, the youngest of three children, to physician Henry Angus Armstrong and Emma Virginia Peronnet (née Thompson-McCausland). The Armstrongs are a North East landowning family distantly related to The 1st Baron Armstrong. Armstrong's maternal grandparents were economist Lucius Thompson-McCausland and Helen Laura McCausland (6 April 1903 – February 2000), granddaughter of Captain Conolly Thomas McCausland (13 May 1828 – 25 June 1902) and Hon. Laura St. John (12 June 1842 – 21 October 1919), daughter of The 15th Baron St John of Bletso. The McCausland family held land at Drenagh in County Londonderry.

Armstrong was educated at Mowden Hall School in Stocksfield, Northumberland, and St Mary's Music School in Edinburgh, where he was a chorister at St Mary's Episcopal Cathedral from the ages of 11 to 13. He attended Durham School and Trinity College, Cambridge, on music scholarships. He played the piano – which has been seen in several The Armstrong and Miller Show sketches – and the cello, the latter of which he dropped in favour of the "much more masculine" oboe.

At Cambridge, Armstrong studied English, receiving a third-class degree, and sang bass baritone as a choral scholar with the college choir. Armstrong joined the Footlights in his final year as part of the writing team for the 1992 revue and was Spooks creator David Wolstencroft's comedy partner.

Career
After graduating in 1992, Armstrong moved to London with friends to pursue a career in acting and comedy. While waiting for acting roles, he worked in several north London bars and restaurants. He was eventually introduced to Ben Miller, who had also moved to London, through Jez Butterworth. In 1996, Armstrong and Miller performed at the Edinburgh Festival Fringe and were nominated for the Perrier Award.

Comedy
Armstrong and Miller co-starred in four series of Armstrong and Miller from 1997 to 2001, while also performing sketches in The Sunday Format. The duo decided to take a break and split for several years to forge their own solo careers. Armstrong renewed his partnership with Miller for the award-winning The Armstrong and Miller Show in 2007. The Armstrong and Miller Book was released in October 2010.

Armstrong appeared in BBC Radio 4's The Very World of Milton Jones, broadcast between 1998 and 2001. He narrated the animated cartoon series The Big Knights in 1999; it first appeared on BBC1 that Christmas. That same year he also starred as Prince Charming in ITV's Christmas pantomime, alongside Ben Miller, Samantha Janus, Paul Merton, Harry Hill, Frank Skinner and Ronnie Corbett. Between early 2000 and early 2001, Armstrong starred as a misanthropic, animal-hating vet in the BBC One sitcom Beast, and he has also been the star of a series of TV commercials for Pimm's.

On BBC Radio 4, Armstrong played John Weak in the office sitcom Weak at the Top. He also played Martin Baine-Jones for the Times Online's Timeghost podcast. Between September and November 2010, Armstrong took The Armstrong and Miller Show on tour in the UK, completing 62 dates. This was the second time The Armstrong and Miller Show had toured, the first tour being in autumn 2001.

Television presenting
On 1 September 2006, Armstrong was chairman of the short-lived Channel 4 panel show Best of the Worst which featured team captains David Mitchell and Johnny Vaughan. Armstrong presented the short-lived ITV1 quiz series Don't Call Me Stupid, in which mismatched celebrities taught each other a subject they are passionate about before facing a studio quiz on their new topic. He has been a frequent guest host on the BBC's satirical Have I Got News for You, having appeared 32 times; he has, to date, made the most appearances of any guest, whether as host or panelist. In 2008, he was the presenter and narrator for When Were We Funniest? and was the only person to feature in all 12 episodes. Armstrong in The Independent was reported to not want to be "pigeonholed" as a presenter, preferring to focus on acting and comedy.

Armstrong has been the presenter of the BBC One game show Pointless with former university friend Richard Osman since it began in 2009. He also presented a documentary, Alexander Armstrong's Very British Holiday, for the BBC on 8 November 2009 about the history of the "great British summer holiday" and his attempts to explore its modern version. On 30 May 2011, Armstrong hosted the pilot for a new panel show, Alexander Armstrong's Big Ask for Dave with Dave Lamb, Katy Brand, Griff Rhys Jones and Robert Webb. After a positive response to the pilot, Dave commissioned the first series, which first aired on 6 February 2012. In July 2011, Armstrong became a co-presenter on BBC One's The Great British Weather. In August 2011, he began presenting Epic Win on BBC One.

In 2012–2013, Armstrong co-hosted ITV series Prize Island with Emma Willis. On the 3rd January 2015, Armstrong and Rochelle Humes co-hosted entertainment special Frank Sinatra: Our Way on BBC One. In September of 2014, it was announced that Armstrong would succeed David Jason as the voice of Danger Mouse in the 2015 revival of the 1980s animated series

On 1 June 2015, Armstrong presented a documentary, Rome's Invisible City, which used 3D scanning technology to discover the underground spaces below the city. Subsequently, it was announced that Armstrong would be making a three-part series exploring the lost and hidden sites of Florence, Naples, and Venice.

In 2015, Armstrong presented a three-part factual series for ITV, called Land of the Midnight Sun, in which he travelled half-way round the Arctic Circle meeting its inhabitants and exploring their ways of life. In January 2016, he guest presented Bruce's Hall of Fame on BBC One.

In 2017, he presented Don't Ask Me Ask Britain and Teach My Pet to Do That, both on ITV.

Armstrong has done other voiceover work, including Mr Wolf and Captain Dog in Peppa Pig and he is the narrator of Hey Duggee.

Singing and music
After over a decade in television and comedy, Armstrong returned to his musical roots and put together his own cover band, which plays a wide range of music from jazz to rock to pop classics. A classically trained bass baritone, he is the vocalist and is backed up by Harry the Piano on keyboards, Simon Bates on woodwind, Jeff Lardner on drums and Dave Swift on bass. The band's first tour ran from 19 September to 6 November 2013.

Armstrong mainly sang at his local parish church services or at weddings, away from the public eye. Armstrong impersonated Susan Boyle's Britain's Got Talent rendition of "I Dreamed a Dream" in the show Your Face Sounds Familiar and surprised the judges by singing in falsetto. He sang "Winter Wonderland" during the celebrities Christmas special of Pointless and "No Rhyme for Richard" from Blondel in BBC Two's Tim Rice: A Life in Song and collaborated with The Sixteen to record the single "Good King Wenceslas" to raise funds for the charity Crisis.

Since September 2014, Armstrong has presented the Saturday afternoon programme on the classical radio station Classic FM. He now also presents the mid-morning show on weekdays between 9am and noon. 

Armstrong participated in VE Day 70: A Party to Remember on 9 May 2015, a televised commemorative concert from Horse Guards Parade in London, where he sang "We Must All Stick Together" by Ralph Butler and Raymond Wallace, and "London Pride", a patriotic song by Noël Coward. He sang in Songs of Praise: The Big Sing, broadcast on 20 September 2015, a special programme from the Royal Albert Hall to commemorate Queen Elizabeth II becoming the world's longest-serving monarch. Armstrong sang I Would Be True.

On 6 November 2015, Armstrong released his debut solo vocal album, A Year of Songs, on Warner Music Group's East West Records label. It reached number 6 on the UK Albums Chart in its first week and topped the UK Classical Chart, the first time a comedian/actor has reached number 1 in that chart. In January and February 2016 he carried out a 9-date UK tour with his band.

In June 2016 he began recording his second album, Upon a Different Shore, which was released on 28 October. It reached number 8 on the UK Albums Chart.

In December 2017, he joined the long list of celebrities who have narrated Prokofiev's Peter and The Wolf for children. Armstrong's version was recorded under the Warner Classics label with the Royal Liverpool Philharmonic Orchestra.

A third studio album, In a Winter Light, was released in November 2017.

Other work
In 1997, Armstrong and Miller provided the voices for lead characters for the PC game 'Wings of Destiny', published by Psygnosis in 2000, as British airmen and Nazi officers covering the two comic-book plots in the game. From 2002 to 2009, Armstrong appeared in a series of British television adverts for the drink Pimm's. With Miller, he has formed a production company called Toff Media.  
In 2002, Armstrong provided the voice for the character Horse in the English dub of the series A Town Called Panic.

The 100 Most Pointless Things in the World was published in the UK by Coronet, an imprint of Hodder & Stoughton, in October 2012.

Also, in 2012, Armstrong was the voice of Professor M for the animation breaks for the McLaren F1 team, with the animations called Tooned (also featuring the voices of Lewis Hamilton and Jenson Button) broadcast on Sky Sports F1.

In 2013, Armstrong and Miller appeared in the television advertising campaign for Spitfire Ale.

In 2014, Armstrong provided the narrator's voice for CBeebies animation Hey Duggee.

In 2019, Armstrong also cameoed in the Horrible Histories:The Movie as Procurator Catus Decianus.

Honours
In December 2015, Armstrong was awarded an honorary doctorate from Northumbria University.

Personal life
On 27 August 2003, Armstrong married Hannah Bronwen Snow, a stay-at-home mother; they have four sons. 
In July 2014 they moved to a  farm in Bledington in Gloucestershire on the border with Oxfordshire.

In February 2011, Armstrong became President of the Literary and Philosophical Society of Newcastle upon Tyne and launched their million pound appeal at a special gala event. He is a patron of several charities, including Family Links, the Charlie Waller Memorial Trust and Just A Drop.

Politics
In an interview with The Independent in March 2012, Armstrong spoke of his support for the rural campaigning organisation the Countryside Alliance, saying "I'd like people to be honest about what they don't like about country sports because if it's actually the people you don't like, then I'd much rather they would actually just say that." He has appeared in their advertisements and magazine to promote countryside shooting. He said that his family had traditionally voted for the Liberal Democrats. Armstrong described himself as a "floating voter", stating "I'm not greatly impressed by party politics, but I am by individual people. I'm a centrist, and very suspicious of any tribalism."

In August 2014, Armstrong was one of 200 public figures who were signatories to a letter to The Guardian expressing their hope that Scotland would vote to remain part of the United Kingdom in September's referendum on that issue.

In 2017, Armstrong urged the UK government to do more to support music education and therapy, saying "in the weft and weave of politics I think these sorts of human stories get shoved to one side, but we have to make sure they are right up front and centre. It's not all about Brexit."

Filmography

Television

Non-presenting roles

Presenting

Film

Radio
December 1998 – Children's Hour with Armstrong and Miller (BBC Radio 4)
2005–2006 – Weak at the Top (BBC Radio 4)
July 2006 – Private Passions (BBC Radio 3)
June 2020 - Hall of Fame (Classic FM)

Video games
2000 – Team Buddies
2003 – Hidden & Dangerous 2

Discography

Studio albums

References

External links

 
 
 
 Alexander Armstrong: A Year Of Songs – Live
 Alexander Armstrong on Classic FM

1970 births
Living people
Alumni of Trinity College, Cambridge
British sketch comedians
English baritones
English game show hosts
English male comedians
English male television actors
English male voice actors
English people of Irish descent
English television presenters
Male actors from Northumberland
People educated at Durham School
People educated at St Mary's Music School
People from Rothbury
Actors from Northumberland
20th-century English comedians
21st-century English comedians
Armstrong and Miller